Vanishing Point is the title of a Canadian radio drama series produced and aired by CBC Radio from 1984 to 1986, and then under a variety of different subtitles until 1992. Created and produced by Bill Lane, Vanishing Point was the CBC’s follow-up to Nightfall, which had instilled new life into its many regional drama centers. Like that series, Vanishing Point drew from the CBC's entire coast to coast network, gathering together the CBC's finest production, engineering, writing, and acting talent to mount one of the better radio dramas in CBC history.

While primarily a science fiction series, the anthology presented a wide range of genres including thriller, horror, detective, psychological drama, comedy and even the occasional musical. A number of episodes were adaptations of short stories from famous authors like Ray Bradbury, Roald Dahl or Evelyn Waugh, but many were original plays from Canada’s top talent. Bill Lane workshopped plays from the winners of various Canadian literary competitions as a way of “reaching an audience by developing the talents of new playwrights.”

Format 
The regular series ran for two seasons and began with a twice-a-week schedule, with a new episode airing each Friday on CBC-AM, and a re-run the following Monday on CBC Stereo.

The show took a hiatus in the summer of 1986 and returning in September with a six-episode adventure called The Black Persian, followed by a miniseries of modernized Nathaniel Hawthorne adaptations, setting a new direction for the series. Now Vanishing Point would act more as an umbrella program under which shorter miniseries would be developed. Some were serialized adaptations of classic science fiction works from authors like Arthur C. Clarke and Ursula K. Le Guin, while most were mini-anthologies, linked by a writer or theme. While still being promoted as Vanishing Point, these series all featured a unique title and opening. In some cases, two subseries ran simultaneously on different days of the week, creating considerable confusion for radio historians. Things continued like this for several years until Vanishing Point went off the air for good in January, 1992.

Episodes 
Below is a full list of the first two seasons of Vanishing Point (episodes 1-69), followed by highlights from its more irregular later run. While the series repeated episodes quite a bit, most of these reruns are not listed except when they help clarify. All episodes listed are around thirty minutes long.

References

External links 
 
 OTR Plot Spot: Vanishing Point - plot summaries and reviews.

CBC Radio One programs
Canadian radio dramas
Canadian science fiction radio programs
Horror fiction radio programmes
Science fiction lists
Anthology radio series